Pure minua is the second single from the Ruoska album, Amortem and was released in 2006.  In Finnish, "Pure minua" means Bite me.

Track listings

 "Pure minua"

References

External links
 Additional information (in Finnish)
 "Pure minua" lyrics

Ruoska songs
2006 singles
2006 songs
EMI Records singles